The year 1604 in music involved some significant events.

Events 
Robert Johnson becomes a royal lutenist in King James I of England's "Private Musick".

Publications 
Gregor Aichinger – Lacrimae D. Virginis et Ioannis in Christum à cruce depositum... (Augsburg: Johannes Praetorius)
Adriano Banchieri – , first book of madrigals for five voices (Milan: Simon Tini & Filippo Lomazzo)
Thomas Bateson – The first set of English Madrigales: to 3. 4. 5. and 6. voices
Lodovico Bellanda –  for three, four, and five voices (Venice: Ricciardo Amadino)
Joachim a Burck –  (A beautiful sacred song, taken from the 19th chapter of the book of Job, of the resurrection of Jesus Christ) for four voices (Erfurt: Johann Beck)
Christoph Demantius –  for six voices (Dresden: Johann Bergen), an epithalamium
John Dowland – Lachrimae, or Seaven Teares figured in seaven passionate pavans, with divers other pavans, galliards and allemands, set forth for the lute, viols or violins, in five parts (London: John Windet)
Johannes Eccard –  for five voices (Königsberg: Georg Neykken), an epithalamium
Christian Erbach
 for four, five, six, seven, eight, and more voices (Augsburg: Johann Praetorius)
, part 1, for five voices (Dillingen: Adam Meltzer), a collection of introits, alleluias and post-communion songs for holy days from Pentecost to Christmas
Alfonso Fontanelli – Second book of madrigals for five voices (Venice: Angelo Gardano), published anonymously
Melchior Franck
 (German Secular Songs and Dances) for four, five, six, and eight voices (Coburg: Justus Hauck)
Marco da Gagliano – Second book of madrigals for five voices (Venice: Angelo Gardano)
Ruggiero Giovannelli – Second book of motets for five voices (Venice: Angelo Gardano)
Thomas Greaves – Songs of Sundrie kinds ... Madrigalles, for five voyces
Konrad Hagius –  for three voices or instruments (Frankfurt: Wolfgang Richter for Johann Spiess)
Giovanni Girolamo Kapsberger –  (Venice)
Carolus Luython – Lamentations for six voices (Prague: Georg Nigrinus)
Luzzasco Luzzaschi – Seventh book of madrigals for five voices (Venice: Giacomo Vincenti)
Tiburtio Massaino
First book of madrigals for six voices (Venice: Angelo Gardano)
Second book of madrigals for six voices (Venice: Giacomo Vincenti)
Ascanio Mayone – First book of madrigals for five voices (Naples: Giovanni Battista Sottile)
Claudio Merulo
Second book of madrigals for five voices (Venice: Angelo Gardano)
Simone Molinaro – First book of motets for five voices (Milan: Agostino Tradate)
Annibale Padovano –  (Venice: Angelo Gardano), published posthumously
Benedetto Pallavicino – Seventh book of madrigals for five voices (Venice: Ricciardo Amadino), published posthumously
Enrico Antonio Radesca - First book of masses for four voices (Milan: Simon Tini & Filippo Lomazzo)
Orfeo Vecchi –  (A collection of madrigals) for five voices (Milan: heirs of Simon Tini & Francesco Lomazzo), a collection of sacred contrafacts of madrigals by other composers, published posthumously

Classical music

Opera

Births 
July 8 – Heinrich Albert, German composer and poet (died 1651)
November 15 – Davis Mell, English violinist (died 1662)
November 26 – Johannes Bach, member of the Bach musical dynasty (died 1673)
date unknown – Francesco Foggia, composer (died 1688)

Deaths 
January 17 – Santino Garsi da Parma, lutenist and composer (born 1542)
February – Emmanuel Adriaenssen, Dutch lutenist and music theorist (born c. 1554)
May 4 – Claudio Merulo, Italian organist and composer (born 1533)
August 30 – Giovenale Ancina, Italian priest, scholar and composer (born 1545)
date unknown
Ludovico Balbi, Venetian singer and composer
Sebastian Raval, Spanish composer (born c. 1550)

 
Music
17th century in music
Music by year